Shannon Lynn Clavelle (born October 12, 1973) is a former American football defensive end in the National Football League for the Green Bay Packers and the Kansas City Chiefs. He played college football at the University of Colorado under head coach Bill McCartney. Clavelle fathered a son, Derek McCartney, with McCartney's daughter, Kristy.

Clavelle was drafted by the Buffalo Bills in the sixth round (185th overall) of the 1995 NFL Draft. He debuted in the NFL though with the Green Bay Packers in 1995. He played on the Packers Super Bowl XXXI Championship team of 1996 that beat the New England Patriots. In 1997, he played six games with the Packers and finished his career that year playing in one game with the Kansas City Chiefs.

References

1973 births
Living people
American football defensive ends
Colorado Buffaloes football players
Green Bay Packers players
Kansas City Chiefs players
Sportspeople from Lafayette, Louisiana
Players of American football from New Orleans